We Women is a 1925 British silent comedy film directed by W. P. Kellino and starring Beatrice Ford, Pauline Cartwright and John Stuart. It depicts the adventures of the flappers Billie and Dollie, who work as dance hostesses.

Cast
 Beatrice Ford as Billie
 Pauline Cartwright as Dollie
 John Stuart as Michael Rivven
 Reginald Bach as Badderley
 Nina Vanna as Kitty Pragnell
 Charles Ashton as Bart Simmons
 Cecil del Gue as Flash Wheeler

References

Bibliography
 Hunter, I.Q. & Porter, Laraine. British Comedy Cinema. Routledge, 2012.
 Low, Rachael. History of the British Film, 1918–1929. George Allen & Unwin, 1971.

External links

1925 films
1926 comedy films
1926 films
British comedy films
British silent feature films
Films based on British novels
Films directed by W. P. Kellino
Films shot at Cricklewood Studios
Stoll Pictures films
Films set in England
British black-and-white films
1925 comedy films
Flappers
1920s English-language films
1920s British films
Silent comedy films